Eupithecia maculosa is a moth in the family Geometridae first described by András Mátyás Vojnits in 1891. It is found in Nepal, north-eastern India and Pakistan.

References

Moths described in 1981
madura
Moths of Asia